The fourth season of the animated series Winx Club aired from 15 April to 13 November 2009, consisting of 26 episodes. The series was created by Iginio Straffi, founder of the Rainbow animation studio.

The season takes place after the events of the previous season and the feature film Winx Club: The Secret of the Lost Kingdom. The Winx Club fairies travel to Earth to protect its last terrestrial fairy from the four Wizards of the Black Circle. They also evolve their magic powers to Believix.

In 2011, the American company Viacom became a co-owner of the Rainbow studio, and Viacom's Nickelodeon began producing a Winx Club revival series. Before airing the Nick-produced episodes, Nickelodeon U.S. premiered the fourth season under the title Winx Club: The Power of Believix from May 6, 2012 to July 29, 2012. The Nickelodeon version was re-recorded with the new voice cast from Hollywood.

Episode list

References

External links
 

Winx Club